Huntington is a census-designated place (CDP) comprising the main village in the town of Huntington in Hampshire County, Massachusetts, United States. The population of the CDP was 936 at the 2010 census, out of a total town population of 2,180. It is part of the Springfield, Massachusetts Metropolitan Statistical Area.

Geography
The Huntington CDP is located in the southwest corner of the town of Huntington. It is bordered to the northwest by the town of Chester, to the southwest by the town of Blandford, to the southeast by the towns of Russell and Montgomery, and to the northeast by the remainder of the town of Huntington. Montgomery Road, the Westfield River, and the Middle Branch of the Westfield former the boundary between the CDP and the rest of the town.

The village of Huntington is in the center of the CDP, at the juncture of the Westfield River with its West Branch. U.S. Route 20 passes through the village, leading southeast down the Westfield River valley  to the city of Westfield, and northwest up the valley of the West Branch  to Chester and eventually  to Lee. Massachusetts Route 112 leads north from Huntington up the Westfield River valley  to Cummington.

The village of Norwich Bridge is in the northern part of the CDP, where Route 112 crosses the Westfield River.

Demographics

References

Census-designated places in Hampshire County, Massachusetts
Springfield metropolitan area, Massachusetts
Census-designated places in Massachusetts